Francisco José Pérez Pérez (8 September 1920 – 11 September 1999) was a Spanish/Cuban chess player.
Born in Vigo, Spain, he won the Spanish Chess Championship in 1948, 1954, and 1960.
He played for Spain in the Chess Olympiads of 1958 and 1960 and in the 1961 European Team Chess Championship.

In international tournaments, his best result was a share of first place at Madrid 1959.
FIDE awarded him the International Master (IM) title in 1959.
After emigrating to Cuba he played second board on the Cuban team in the 1964 Olympiad.

References

Further reading

External links

1920 births
1999 deaths
Sportspeople from Vigo
Spanish chess players
Cuban chess players
Chess International Masters
Spanish emigrants to Cuba
20th-century chess players